Hamadoni District is a district in the south-east of Khatlon Region of Tajikistan, located south of Kulob and stretching along a section of the Panj on the border with Afghanistan. Between 1950 and 2004 it was called Moskovskiy town, then renamed in honor of Mir Sayyid Ali Hamadani, a 14th-century Persia Great Islamic preacher, traveller, poet, and scholar who preached Islam in different parts of world, and is buried in Khatlon.

The district capital is Moskovskiy or Moskva. The population of the district is 148,800 (January 2020 estimate).

Administrative divisions
They are as follows:

References

Districts of Khatlon Region
Districts of Tajikistan